Metromedia is an American media company.

Metromedia can also mean:

 Metromedia Fiber Network, Inc., later AboveNet
 Metromedia Restaurant Group
 Metromedia Square, the former Fox Television Center broadcast facility
 Metromedia, the post-1971 name for the sound system Tom the Great Sebastian